is set to participate in the Eurovision Song Contest 2023 in Liverpool, United Kingdom, with "Duje" performed by Albina & Familja Kelmendi.

Background 

Albania accomplished its second-highest placing when first participating in 2004, with the song "The Image of You" performed by Anjeza Shahini, finishing in seventh place. After 2017, Albania managed to qualify for the final in the three following contests. In , the nation failed to qualify for the final, placing 12th and scoring 58 points with the song "Sekret" performed by Ronela Hajati, marking Albania's eighth non-qualification.

The Albanian national broadcaster,  (RTSH), broadcasts the contest within Albania and organises  as the national selection format for the contest. Following the nation's debut in 2004, RTSH has consistently selected the Albanian performers and songs through the latter event, which features a competition among artists and songs. The broadcaster confirmed Albania's intention to participate in the 2023 contest on 3 June 2022, with the European Broadcasting Union (EBU) reaffirming the nation's participation on 20 October.

Before Eurovision

Artist selection 

A jury selected the top three of the festival and award two prizes for young and alternative groups and established artists, while a separate televoting selected Albania's entry for Eurovision.

RTSH opened an application period for interested artists and composers to submit their applications from 3 June 2022. The provisional list of 26 artists was published on 27 October 2022. On 20 November 2022, host Arbana Osmani confirmed via social media that, unlike in recent years, when RTSH released competing songs ahead of the shows, the songs competing in the festival would not be revealed until the contest. In the first two semi-finals, all 26 artists sang their songs, for the first time. At the end of the second semi-final, five out of ten contestants of the New artists section were selected by a member jury panel, to advance to the fourth and final show of the contest. However, all 16 contestants of the Big artists section advanced to the final with no qualifications taking place beforehand.

Final 
The final took place on 22 December 2022. During the show, the Young or Alternative Group Award and the Career Award were handed out. The jury picked their top 3 favourites, with the audience alone voting on who will represent Albania in the Eurovision Song Contest 2023. Voting was available from Albania and Kosovo. Elsa Lila with the song "Evita" emerged as the winner, while runner-up Albina & Familja Kelmendi with the song "Duje" was the winner of the separate televote selection and was thus announced as Albania's representative for the Eurovision Song Contest 2023.

Key:  Winner  Second place  Third place

At Eurovision 
According to Eurovision rules, all nations with the exceptions of the host country and the "Big Five" (France, Germany, Italy, Spain and the United Kingdom) are required to qualify from one of two semi-finals in order to compete for the final; the top ten countries from each semi-final progress to the final. The European Broadcasting Union (EBU) split up the competing countries into six different pots based on voting patterns from previous contests, with countries with favourable voting histories put into the same pot. On 31 January 2023, an allocation draw was held, which placed each country into one of the two semi-finals, and determined which half of the show they would perform in. Albania has been placed into the second semi-final, to be held on 11 May 2023, and has been scheduled to perform in the second half of the show.

References 

2023
Albania
2023 in Albanian music
Eurovision Song Contest